Susan Ann Jackson-Wagner (born 30 March 1965) is a British former competitive figure skater. She is a two-time British national champion (1984, 1985) in ladies' singles and competed at the 1984 Olympics, placing 17th. Jackson placed 12th at the 1984 World Championships in Ottawa and seventh at the 1986 European Championships in Copenhagen.

Since retiring from competition, Jackson-Wagner has been a longtime skating coach in Tennessee.

Competitive highlights

References

Jackson-Wagner values teaching aspect of skating

British female single skaters
1965 births
Olympic figure skaters of Great Britain
Figure skaters at the 1984 Winter Olympics
Living people
Sportspeople from Nottingham